Robert Openshaw (1891 – 6 November 1962) was a British trade unionist.

Born in Bolton, Openshaw was a keen cricketer, and once took all ten wickets in a Bolton Cricket League match.  He moved to Crewe to find work, and became an engineer in the railway workshops there.  He joined the Amalgamated Engineering Union and in 1930 was one of the youngest members to be elected to the union's executive council.

Openshaw represented the AEU on the National Executive Committee of the Labour Party from 1940 to 1948, and at the Trades Union Congress (TUC).  He served as the TUC's representative to the American Federation of Labour in 1947, and was also elected to the General Council of the TUC in 1948.

In 1953, Openshaw was elected as the President of the AEU; he served until his retirement, three years later.

References

1891 births
1962 deaths
Members of the General Council of the Trades Union Congress
People from Bolton
Presidents of the Amalgamated Engineering Union